Malaysiakini (meaning in English: "Malaysia Now") is an online news portal published in Malay, English, Chinese and Tamil. Malaysiakini receives over 2.3 million page-views per day on desktop and mobile. Alexa ranked malaysiakini.com as the 13th most popular web site in Malaysia (first in term of online news portal) in 2015.

In Malaysia, traditional print and broadcast media are tightly regulated and controlled by the government. Malaysiakini has attempted and largely succeeded in  achieving an independent voice by allowing editors and journalists the full freedom to practise professional and ethical journalism, without interference from the shareholders, advertisers or government.

Founding
Malaysiakini was founded by Premesh Chandran and Steven Gan in November 1999. Frustrated with the constraints that they experienced while working for The Sun newspaper, Premesh and Gan decided to use the Multimedia Super Corridor pledge to create a space for uncensored journalism.

The site began with a staff of five journalists and a starting budget of $100,000, raised with the inital versions of the publication prepared by Premesh.Premesh served as CEO, and Gan served as its editor-in-chief. For its first story, Malaysiakini posted a report on 20 November criticising the practices of Sin Chew Daily, Malaysia's largest-circulation Chinese-language newspaper. Sin Chew Daily had doctored a photograph of Malaysia's ruling party to remove Anwar Ibrahim, who had recently been imprisoned for corruption.

According to BBC News, the Malaysiakini report led to "worldwide infamy" for  Sin Chew Daily, and the newspaper later issued a public apology. In April 2001, Malaysiakini made news again when it discovered and reported the secret detention of 10 political activists for participating in a rally in favour of the imprisoned former Deputy Prime Minister Anwar Ibrahim.

Content
The Malaysiakini website is updated daily. Its news coverage concentrates mainly on local events, with a strong emphasis on items related to Malaysian politics. Malaysiakini also publishes columns, blogs, and features that offer diverse viewpoints, both on local and international issues. Malaysiakini claims to practice an editorial policy that is consistently supportive of justice, human rights, democracy, freedom of speech, and good governance.

In 2013, Malaysiakini's parent company launched two sites - business portal KiniBiz and internet TV news site KiniTV.

KiniBiz closed on 1 February 2016 after failing to find new investors.  The Star reported that KiniBiz had been searching for investors since mid-2015, shortly after the business portal launched its fortnightly print magazine in April 2015.

KiniTV is still an integral part of operations.

Malaysiakini publishes its readers' opinions in its letters section. The letters section has generated active participation from readers of all races and religions and of various ideological backgrounds, creating an open arena of public debate unseen in Malaysia since the 1960s. Among other common topics are taboo subjects such as migrant workers, AIDS, Islam, and racial quota systems. Malaysiakini avoids exercising excessive editorial control on the letters section, as it attempts to foster a spirit of reasoned discussion.

Funding
In September 2012, Malaysiakini admitted to receiving grants from National Endowment for Democracy and other organisations.

Premesh Chandran, the CEO of Malaysiakini said that Malaysiakini is "transparent about such partnerships" and that the foreign grants "form a small part of Malaysiakini budget".

He also said that Malaysiakini is 70% owned by its co-founders and staff. He claimed that despite receiving grants from international donors, the editorial independence was not compromised. He said about the matter in a statement in response to media reports following controversy over funding provided by the National Endowment for Democracy to human rights groups such as SUARAM and a host of other organisations, including Malaysiakini.

Malaysiakini's former editor YL Chong falsely claimed that George Soros indirectly funded the online news portal and that the online news portal refused to allow this fact to be known and that the former editor resigned in protest. Malaysiakini refuted these allegations.

It was also notable that in 2019, Facebook removed the New Atlas, the Land Destroyer and the New Eastern Outlook pages for engaging in “coordinated inauthentic behaviour" - a term to describe the activities of paid cyber troopers.

Aborted print version
Malaysiakini applied in 2010 for a license to circulate its content in print as a newspaper, which was rejected by the Home Ministry. It successfully appealed in the High Court and the High Court judged that Malaysiakini was to be issued a publication permit. The Home Ministry appealed the High Court decision in the Court of Appeal. The appeal was dismissed. Legally victorious, the newspaper requested the Home Ministry again for a permit. However, the application was rejected again.

Awards and recognition
In 2001, Malaysiakini won a Free Media Pioneer award from the International Press Institute.

Gan himself won a 2000 International Press Freedom Award of the Committee to Protect Journalists, "an annual recognition of courageous journalism". In July 2001, Businessweek named him one of the "Stars of Asia" in the category "Opinion Shapers" for his work with the website.

In 2014, it received Social Media Award during Worldwide Bloggers and Social Media Award 2014 in Kuala Lumpur.

Through the years, Malaysiakini has won various awards and accolades from the International Press Institute, Reporters Sans Frontiers, Committee to Protect Journalists, Asiaweek and Businessweek. Malaysiakini is also the only media organisation in Southeast Asia nominated to the prestigious World Economic Forum’s International Media Council.

Additionally, Malaysiakini has developed a reputation for providing a platform for academics such as Jomo Kwame Sundram, Farish A. Noor and Wong Chin Huat to reach a wider audience. Its columnists have also included activists such as Hishamuddin Rais and independent preacher Wan Ji Wan Hussin as well as award-winning investigative journalist R. Nadeswaran.

Malaysiakini has maintained its top slot as Malaysia's most read news website, despite the introduction of a paywall for paid subscribers. It has fought off the challenge of rivals such as The Star Online, Free Malaysia Today and the now defunct The Malaysian Insider to consistently maintain its top ranking.

Malaysiakini is completely unaffiliated with Malaysianow - a much smaller news website that uses the English translation of Malaysiakini as its name.

Notable events
Malaysiakini has attracted its fair share of controversy and harassment. In March 2001, police in the Malaysian state of Selangor lodged a report against the website for quoting comments questioning the official death toll from racial rioting in the city of Petaling Jaya. In July of the same year, a university student leader filed a report claiming that a letter published on Malaysiakini bearing his name was not written by him.

However, the most serious incident occurred on 20 January 2003 when Malaysiakini was raided by the Malaysian police. Four servers and 15 personal computers from its office worth RM150,000 (US$39,500) were seized during the raid. The police raid was instigated after the right-wing cadres in UMNO Youth, an arm of the ruling United Malays National Organisation (UMNO), complained that a letter written by "Petrof", a reader, and published on Malaysiakini's website was seditious.

In its police report, UMNO Youth claimed that the letter had questioned the special rights and privileges of the Bumiputras that are enshrined in the Constitution. Additionally, UMNO Youth claimed that the letter also contained false allegations that the Malaysian government was unfair to other ethnic races in the country. The seizure of the hardware temporarily silenced Malaysiakini, though it eventually resumed its normal operations.

On 1 April 2005, Malaysiakini published a fake news report alleging that four unnamed senior government officials were being charged for corruption. The report turned out to be an April Fool's joke, albeit published with the intention of casting the spotlight on official corruption, a problem still rife in Malaysia. These caused quite a stir in Malaysia with the government ordering a probe on the news organisation.

On Feb 25, 2014, red paint was splashed outside Malaysiakini's then office premise at Bangsar Utama, Kuala Lumpur.

A cardboard box with a duck inside was left at the main entrance. The box had a photograph of DAP's Seputeh MP Teresa Kok strapped to it.

The act was perceived as a threat to Malaysiakini and its staff.

In 2015, political cartoonist Zunar (Zulkiflee Anwar Haque) whose work has run in Malaysiakini for many years, was charged under the Sedition Act 1948 for criticising the Malaysian government in a number of posts on Twitter and was charged under the Sedition Act 1948. The charges were dropped after the change of government in 2018.

On Nov 5, 2016, right-wing Umno leader Jamal Yunos led a group of his Red Shirt protesters to the entrance of the news portal's new office premises in Petaling Jaya. They called for Malaysiakini to be closed down but stopped at a barricade set up by police and eventually left.

Court cases
In May 2007, the news portal was sued for defamation by then Chief Minister of Sarawak, Abdul Taib Mahmud in the Kuala Lumpur High Court, an apology, unspecified amount of damages and injunction against Malaysiakini and Gan, for 12 articles  between 6 April and 3 May that year. The suit was retracted in January 2012 after the news portal made an apology in public court for publishing unverified news.

On 19 February 2021, Malaysiakini was found guilty of contempt by the Federal Court of Malaysia over five user comments posted on the website that the Malaysian Attorney General claimed undermined public confidence in the judiciary.

The news website was fined RM 500,000 Malaysian ringgit (US$123,644). However, Malaysiakini's editor-in-chief Steven Gan was not found guilty of the offence. The website sought public donations to pay the fine and received donation exceeding the fine amount within the span of roughly four hours.

In covering the trial, the BBC in an article called Malaysiakini: The upstart that changed Malaysia's media landscape said that "Malaysiakini's success so far, its very survival, are all the more remarkable in a country where all news media was once subject to government control, and in a region where truly independent, quality journalism is difficult, dangerous and often driven to the margins."

The New York Times meanwhile wrote a piece called 5 Reader Comments Just Cost a News Website $124,000 in which they wrote that Gan and Malaysiakini were being punished for the outlet’s diligent reporting. It quoted Gan as saying that the court's decision would "have a tremendous chilling impact on discussions of issues of public interest and it delivers a body blow to our continual campaign to fight corruption."

Later on July 2, 2021, the Federal Court of Malaysia ordered Malaysiakini to pay RM550,000 (US$132,180) in damages for a defamation case filed by a now-defunct Australian mining firm.

Malaysiakini had been sued in 2012 for publishing several articles and videos about residents' concerns over pollution allegedly linked to Raub Australian Gold Mine's gold mining operations in Malaysia. The company had said the articles were defamatory and malicious.

The Kuala Lumpur High Court in 2016 ruled in favour of Malaysiakini on the grounds of responsible journalism and reportage, but the decision was later overturned on appeal.

The Federal Court upheld the appellate court's decision in a 3-2 majority ruling, saying Malaysiakini had not been "fair, disinterested or adopted a neutral approach" in reporting the residents' campaign against the mining activities.

The ruling came amid concern among activists about freedom of expression in Malaysia, with Malaysiakini perceived to be particularly targeted as the most widely read independent news media source.

See also

 The Star (Malaysia)
 Malay Mail
 Free Malaysia Today
 The Malaysian Insider
 Steven Gan
 Zulkiflee Anwar Haque
 Wong Chin Huat
 Hishamuddin Rais
 Jomo Kwame Sundaram
 Farish A. Noor

References

Literature
 Chin, James (2003). MalaysiaKini.com and its Impact on Journalism and Politics in Malaysia. In K.C. Ho, Randy Kluver, & C.C. Yang (Eds.), Asia.com: Asia Encounters the Internet, pp. 129–142. London: RoutledgeCurzon. .

External links
 
 

 
1999 establishments in Malaysia
Malaysian news websites
Malaysian political websites